Michelle Mussman (born August 17, 1972) is the Illinois State Representative from the 56th district. She has held the position since 2011. The 56th district includes all or parts of Schaumburg, Elk Grove Village, Roselle, Hoffman Estates, Hanover Park, Rolling Meadows and Bloomingdale.

Electoral career
In 2010, Mussman was elected to the Illinois General Assembly as the Representative from the 56th district. She was reelected in 2012, 2014, 2016, 2018, and 2020.

Illinois House of Representatives

Committees
Mussman currently serves on seven committees and one subcommittee: the Elementary & Secondary Education: School Curriculum & Policies committee (Chairperson), the Adoption & Child Welfare committee, the Appropriations-Human Services committee, the Energy & Environment committee, the Mental Health & Addiction committee (Vice-Chairperson), the Child Care Access & Early Childhood committee, the Housing Committee, and the Special Issues Subcommittee.

Legislation
During her tenure as State Representative, Mussman has introduced several bills that have gone on to become law in Illinois. This includes HB0135, which requires health insurers to extend coverage to birth control prescribed by pharmacists, as well as HB0452, which requires the Illinois Department of Human Services to "prescribe and supervise" the implementation of vocational rehabilitation programs for people with disabilities as needed.

Personal life
Mussman attended Purcell Marian High School in Cincinnati, OH, graduating in 1990 before attending the University of Cincinnati College of Design, Architecture, Art, and Planning where she received her Bachelor of Science degree in Graphic Design. Prior to being elected as State Representative, Michelle served as president and treasurer of her local Parent Teacher Association and as a member of the Schaumburg Township Council of Parent Teacher Associations. In the 2016 United States presidential election, Mussman served as a presidential elector for Illinois.

Mussman is married to her husband, George, and has three sons.

Electoral history

See also 
 Illinois House of Representatives elections, 2010

References

External links
Illinois General Assembly Profile
By session: 98th, 97th
Michelle Mussman for State Representative 
 
Rep. Michelle Mussman at Illinois House Democrats

1972 births
Living people
Women state legislators in Illinois
Democratic Party members of the Illinois House of Representatives
21st-century American politicians
People from Schaumburg, Illinois
People from Aberdeen, Maryland
University of Cincinnati alumni
21st-century American women politicians
2016 United States presidential electors